Falaknuma–Bhuvanagiri MEMU is a MEMU passenger train running from Falaknuma in Hyderabad to Bhuvanagiri in Yadadri Bhuvanagiri district

The train runs two services from Falaknuma and Bhongir twice a day. The numbers are 67275 & 67276.Recently Afternoon train Extended upto Janagam.

Code	Station Name	Arrives

1FM	Falaknuma		06:10(Starting Point)

2HPG	Huppuguda	06:13

3YKA	Yakutpura	06:17

4DQR	Dabirpura	06:19	

5MXT	Malakpet	06:21

6KCG	Kacheguda	06:26

7VAR	Vidya Nagar	06:31

8JOO	Jamai Osmania	06:33

9ATC	Arts College	06:35

10STPD	Sitafalmandi	06:38

11MJF	Malkajgiri Junction	06:41

12CHZ	Charlapalli	07:04

13GT	Ghatkesar	07:19

14BN	Bibinagar	07:29

15BG	Bhuvanagiri	08:00(Arrival)

References

Hyderabad railway division
Electric multiple units of India
Rail transport in Telangana